Alexander "Sandy" Mutch (9 December 1884 – 16 September 1967) was a Scottish football goalkeeper.

Playing career
Mutch was born in Inverurie, Aberdeenshire, Scotland, the sixth of twelve children of Alexander Mutch (1851–1938) and Ann Milne Birse (1856–1933). He began his football career with Aberdeen before playing for Huddersfield Town between 1910 and 1922, winning the FA Cup once and helping Huddersfield into the Football League First Division in 1920. While playing for Huddersfield, he played in two FA Cup Finals: 1920 where they lost 1–0 to Aston Villa after extra time, and in the 1922 Cup Final which they won 1–0 against Preston North End.
 
His Newcastle United debut was on 26 Aug 1922 against Everton, a home match. In 1924 he was in the team for the FA Cup Final again, (his third FA Cup Final in four years), but shortly before Newcastle's 2–0 victory over Aston Villa he suffered a bad knee injury which eventually led to his retirement as a player.

Later career
Later at Newcastle United, he became the coach for the first team and then finally a groundsman at the club he loved so much until he left due to poor health.

Mutch died of kidney failure in 1967.

Honours
Huddersfield Town
Football League Second Division runners-up: 1919–20
FA Cup winners: 1922
FA Cup finalists: 1920
FA Charity Shield winners: 1922

References

External links
 Newcastle United profile

1884 births
1967 deaths
Scottish footballers
Association football goalkeepers
English Football League players
Scottish Football League players
Aberdeen F.C. players
Huddersfield Town A.F.C. players
Newcastle United F.C. players
People from Inverurie
Deaths from kidney failure
Footballers from Aberdeenshire
FA Cup Final players